Clemens Scheitz (2 September 1899 – 24 October 1980) was a German musician and actor who appeared in the Werner Herzog films The Enigma of Kaspar Hauser (1974), Heart of Glass (1976), Stroszek (1977) and Nosferatu the Vampyre (1979).

Life
He was born in Munich where his father was a tailor and he had an interest in physics and was a self-taught pianist. He earned a living through concert performances, piano lessons, small acting roles, and as an inventor. As a young man he appeared in a 1922 silent film directed by Adolf Wenter and starring Victor Colani entitled The Prince Regatta. He also supplied music for the Herzog film Woyzeck (1979).

Filmography

References

External links
 

1899 births
1980 deaths
Male actors from Munich
German male actors
German male film actors
20th-century German male actors
20th-century German musicians
20th-century German male musicians